Eanbeorht (or Eanberht) was a medieval Bishop of Hexham who was consecrated in 800 and died in 813.

Citations

References

External links
 

Bishops of Hexham
813 deaths
Year of birth unknown
9th-century English bishops